Ryan Chauncey Smith (born July 17, 1985) is a former American football cornerback. He played for the Florida Gators in college. He was also the nation's leader in interceptions (eight) in his final season at Florida.

Career
Raised in Diamond Bar, Smith attended Bishop Amat Memorial High School in La Puente, CA.  He chose to play for Utah and was an immediate starter under Urban Meyer's surprise 2004 Utes team, winning the Fiesta Bowl as a mid-major team.  Using a new and scrutinized NCAA rule, Smith took 21 credit hours during the summer of 2006 to graduate and be eligibile to play at a new college the next season.  He re-united with Meyer in Florida for the University of Florida 2006 season, where he was a starter for the 2006 National champions.

He declared for the 2007 NFL Draft despite having a year of eligibility remaining.

Smith was drafted with the 206th pick in the 2007 NFL Draft by the Tennessee Titans. On August 31, 2007 Smith was released by the Titans.

See also 
 List of Florida Gators football All-Americans

References

External links 
 Florida Gators bio
 Utah Utes bio

Living people
1985 births
People from Diamond Bar, California
American football cornerbacks
Utah Utes football players
Florida Gators football players
Tennessee Titans players
Players of American football from California
Sportspeople from Los Angeles County, California